Patrizia Scianca (born July 5, 1961) is an Italian voice actress from Turin who has dubbed over a number of notable roles in anime.

Roles

Television animation
The Adventures of Jimmy Neutron: Boy Genius (Judy Neutron (Megan Cavanagh))
Bakusō Kyōdai Let's & Go!! (Go Seiba (Haruna Ikezawa))
City Hunter (Saeko Nogami (Yōko Asagami))
Doraemon (Suneo)
Dragon Ball (Son Goku, Son Gohan and Goten as children (Masako Nozawa))
Dr. Slump (second anime and second dub of the first one) (Arale Norimaki (Taeko Kawata, Mami Koyama))
Fullmetal Alchemist (Edward Elric as a child (Romi Park))
Kodocha (Tsuyoshi Ohki (Mayumi Misawa))
Marmalade Boy (Chiyako (Hiroko Emori))
Mermaid Melody Pichi Pichi Pitch (Izul)
Mirmo! (Yashichi (Yukiji))
My Life as a Teenage Robot (Tuck (Audrey Wasilewski))
Ojamajo Doremi (Majorika (Naomi Nagasawa))
One Piece (Monkey D. Luffy as a child (Mayumi Tanaka), Tamanegi (Makiko Ōmoto) and Nico Robin (Yuriko Yamaguchi)
Rocket Power (Maurice "Twister" Rodriguez (Ulysses Cuadra))
Sailor Moon (Sailor Neptune (Masako Katsuki))
Sonic the Hedgehog (Bunnie Rabbot (Christine Cavanaugh))
Shaman King (Manta Oyamada)
Tokyo Mew Mew (Zakuro Fujiwara (Junko Noda))

Theatrical animation
Balto II: Wolf Quest (Saba (Melanie Spore))
Dead End Adventure (Nico Robin)

References
 Patrizia Scianca at Il mondo dei doppiatori

External links

1961 births
Italian voice actresses
Living people
Actors from Turin